Joseph Franklin "Jumping Joe" Fulks (October 26, 1921 – March 21, 1976) was an American professional basketball player, sometimes called "the first of the high-scoring forwards". He was posthumously enshrined in the Naismith Memorial Basketball Hall of Fame in 1978.

Early life

Fulks was born in Birmingham, Kentucky, a small town in the state's far-western Purchase region that was inundated in the 1940s after the Tennessee Valley Authority dammed the Tennessee River to create Kentucky Lake.

College career
He played college ball at Murray State University (then known as Murray State Teachers College) for two years before leaving school to join the Marines in May 1942. He served with 3rd Battalion, 9th Marines during World War II, and was discharged as a corporal in May 1946. His number 26 hangs in the rafters at Murray State's CFSB Center.

Professional career

Philadelphia Warriors (1946–1954)
Fulks joined the BAA's Philadelphia Warriors in 1946, at age 25, and as a rookie won the league's first scoring title with a 23.2 points per game average as the Warriors won the BAA title. Fulks again led the league's in scoring average during the 1947–48 season at 22.1 points per game, but lost the scoring title to Max Zaslofsky, who had more total points. Fulks had a career best 26.0 points per game average in the 1948–49 season. Fulks led the NBA in free throw percentage during the 1950–51 season.

Fulks set the BAA/NBA single game scoring record four different times. On December 3, 1946, in just his eighth game as a professional, Fulks became the league's record holder for most points scored in a single game when he scored 37 points, making 16 field goals and five free throws, in Philadelphia's 76–68 win over the Providence Steam Rollers. Just 20 games later on January 14, 1947, Fulks set a new single game scoring record when he scored 41 points, making 15 field goals and 11 free throws, in Philadelphia's 104–74 win over the Toronto Huskies. In the 1946–47 season, Fulks also led the league in scoring for its inaugural season, scoring 23.2 points per game. Two seasons later, on December 18, 1948, Fulks tied Carl Braun's single game scoring record when he scored 47 points, making 18 field goals and 11 free throws, in Philadelphia's 94–90 win against the Providence Steamrollers.

For the fourth and final time, Fulks set a new single-game scoring record when he scored 63 points on February 10, 1949.  It remained the most in an NBA game until Elgin Baylor scored 64 points in a 1959 game.  Fulks' 63-point outburst came during a Warriors 108–87 victory over the Indianapolis Jets. Fulks made 27 of 56 field goal attempts and nine of 14 free throws. Along the way he shattered the record for most points in one half (33), field goals, and field goal attempts. Two seasons after his 63 point game, on January 4, 1951, Fulks grabbed a career-high 16 rebounds, alongside scoring 20 points, in a 92-69 win over the  Baltimore Bullets.

The 6'5" (1.96 m) Fulks was known both for his athletic drives to the basket as well as his shooting. He was perhaps most remembered as one of the pioneers of the modern jump shot. During his early career, Fulks was considered the league's greatest offensive player. In his first three seasons, Fulks averaged 23.9 points per game at a time when, before the advent of the shot-clock, teams rarely scored over 70 points in a game. Fulks was named to the All-BAA First Team during his first three seasons. In 1971, he was one of 25 players named to the NBA 25th Anniversary Team.  However, indicative of his era, Fulks was a low-efficiency shooter, holding the 18th worst career field goal percentage in NBA history for players who attempted at least 1,000 shots, making only 30.2% of the shots he attempted. He holds the record for missed shots in a game, in both the regular season and playoffs.

Later life and death
Upon his retirement, Fulks returned to Marshall County, Kentucky, where he lived the remainder of his life. He worked at the Kentucky State Penitentiary as the prison recreation director. Fulks was shot and killed on March 21, 1976, by Gregg Bannister, the son of his girlfriend, Roberta Bannister, during an argument over a handgun. A jury found Bannister guilty of reckless homicide and he was sentenced to four and a half years in prison. Fulks was buried in Briensburg, Kentucky.

BAA/NBA career statistics

Regular season

Playoffs

See also
List of National Basketball Association players with most points in a game
List of National Basketball Association annual scoring leaders

References

Further reading

External links
Official NBA profile

 Basketball Hall of Fame profile
 

1921 births
1976 deaths
Amateur Athletic Union men's basketball players
United States Marine Corps personnel of World War II
American men's basketball players
Basketball players from Kentucky
Deaths by firearm in Kentucky
Male murder victims
Murray State Racers men's basketball players
Naismith Memorial Basketball Hall of Fame inductees
National Basketball Association All-Stars
National Collegiate Basketball Hall of Fame inductees
People from Marshall County, Kentucky
People murdered in Kentucky
Philadelphia Warriors players
Power forwards (basketball)
United States Marines